Serge Rousselle is a Canadian politician, who was elected to the Legislative Assembly of New Brunswick in the 2014 provincial election. He represented the electoral district of Tracadie-Sheila as a member of the Liberal Party until 2018, when he did not run for reelection and was succeeded by his former constituency assistant Keith Chiasson.

On October 7, 2014, Rousselle was appointed to the Executive Council of New Brunswick as Minister of Education and Early Childhood Development, and Attorney General.

He holds undergraduate degrees in political science and law from the University of Ottawa as well as a Master of Law from the University of Cambridge and a Doctor of Law from McGill University. After being abroad for his studies, he returned to Tracadie, New Brunswick, and was a professor at the Université de Moncton law faculty from 1992 to 2014. He served as dean from 2000 to 2004.

Rousselle has also held various positions in organizations at the provincial, federal, and international level. Among other positions, he was head of the Bureau des Amériques of the Agence universitaire de la Francophonie, was President of the Council of Canadian Law Deans as well as President of the Association des juristes d’expression française du Nouveau-Brunswick.

Rousselle is the co-author of the book entitled "Éducation et droits collectifs : au-delà de l'article 23 de la Charte" (2003, Editions de la francophonie), which was awarded the 2003 France-Acadie award.

Election results

References

Living people
Members of the Executive Council of New Brunswick
New Brunswick Liberal Association MLAs
People from Gloucester County, New Brunswick
21st-century Canadian politicians
Attorneys General of New Brunswick
McGill University Faculty of Law alumni
Alumni of the University of Cambridge
University of Ottawa alumni
Academic staff of the Université de Moncton
Year of birth missing (living people)